Crvena Jabuka is a village in the municipality of Babušnica, Serbia. Црвена јабука means 'red apple' in Serbian. According to the 2002 census, the village has a population of 126 people.

References

Populated places in Pirot District